Buheung-dong (부흥동, 復興洞) is neighborhood of Dongan district in the city of Anyang, Gyeonggi Province, South Korea.

External links
 Buheung-dong 

Dongan-gu
Neighbourhoods in Anyang, Gyeonggi